Oscar Rudolph Burkard (December 21, 1877 – February 18, 1950) was a German-American soldier who served in the U.S. Army during the Indian Wars and World War I. In 1899, he received the Medal of Honor for his actions during the Battle of Sugar Point. Aside from being the only non-combatant to be decorated from that engagement, Burkard was also the last man to receive the medal during the Indian Wars.

Biography
Born in Achern, Germany, he immigrated to the United States in 1895 and joined the US Army at Fort Snelling in April 1898. Assigned to the 3rd U.S. Infantry, he served as a private in the Hospital Corps and was present as an acting hospital steward at the Battle of Sugar Point on October 5, 1898. During the battle, he rescued several soldiers while under heavy fire from the Pillagers and continued to do so throughout the day. He was later awarded the Medal of Honor "for distinguished bravery in action against hostile Indians" and officially received the award on August 21, 1899.

Seeing service during World War I, he retired at the rank of major on October 31, 1930, and died in Rome, New York on February 18, 1950. He is buried in Rome Cemetery.

See also

List of Medal of Honor recipients
List of Medal of Honor recipients for the Indian Wars

References

External links

http://oscarburkard.org/

1877 births
1950 deaths
American military personnel of the Indian Wars
United States Army personnel of World War I
United States Army Medal of Honor recipients
German emigrants to the United States
Military personnel from Minnesota
People from Rome, New York
German-born Medal of Honor recipients
American Indian Wars recipients of the Medal of Honor
People from Achern